The following is a list of Flags used in Saudi Arabia. For more information about the national flag, see the Flag of Saudi Arabia.

National Flag

Royal Flags

Ministry Flag

Military Flags

Historical Flags

See also 
 Flag of Saudi Arabia
 Emblem of Saudi Arabia

References

External links 

 
 World Flags Information, Saudi Arabian page
 Saudi Arabian flag and associated information

Lists and galleries of flags
Flags